The Way It Feels is the ninth studio album by Heather Nova, released on May 29, 2015.

Track listing

Charts

References

2015 albums
Heather Nova albums